Spliff may refer to:

A joint (cannabis), one of numerous slang terms for a cigarette made from cannabis; it may also refer to one of the following derivative names:
Spliff (band), a German 80s new wave band;
Jimmy Spliff, another name for punk singer Jimmy Gestapo;
Sam the Spliff, a character in the martial arts film Shaolin Dolemite;
a song by Austrian band Bilderbuch.
P-Splifff or psplifff, another name for Dominican American skateboarder Pablo Ramirez
Spliff Star, an American rapper and producer from Flatbush, Brooklyn, New York